Tripa River is a river in the province of Aceh, northern Sumatra island, Indonesia, about 1600 km northwest of the capital Jakarta.

Geography
The river flows in the northern area of Sumatra with predominantly tropical rainforest climate (designated as Af in the Köppen-Geiger climate classification). The annual average temperature in the area is 23 °C. The warmest month is January, when the average temperature is around 24 °C, and the coldest is August, at 22 °C. The average annual rainfall is 4124 mm. The wettest month is November, with an average of 541 mm rainfall, and the driest is July, with 193 mm rainfall.

See also
List of rivers of Indonesia
List of rivers of Sumatra

References

Rivers of Aceh
Rivers of Indonesia